Environment Protection Act, 1986 is an Act of the Parliament of India. It was enacted in May 1986 and came into force on 19 November 1986. It has 26 sections and 4 chapters. The Act is widely considered to have been a response to the Bhopal gas leak. The Act was passed by the Government of India under the Article 253 of the Constitution of India, which empowers to union government to enact laws to give effect to international agreements signed by the country. The purpose of the Act is to implement the decisions of the United Nations Conference on the Human Environment. They relate to the protection and improvement of the human environment and the prevention of hazards to human beings, other living creatures, plants and property. The Act is an “umbrella” legislation that has provided a framework for the environmental regulation regime in India, which covers all major industrial and infrastructure activities and prohibits and regulates specific activities in coastal areas and eco-sensitive areas. The Act also provides for coordination of the activities of various central and state authorities established under other environment-related laws, such as the Water Act and the Air Act.

History
This act was enacted by the Parliament of India in 1986. As the introduction says, "An Act to provide for the protection and improvement of environment and for matters connected therewith: Where as the decisions were taken at the United Nations Conference on the Human Environment held at Stockholm in June 1972, in which India participated, to take appropriate steps for the protection and improvement of human environment. Where as it is considered necessary further to implement the decisions aforesaid in so far as they relate to the protection and improvement of environment and the prevention of hazards to human beings, other living creatures, plants and property".
 This was due to Bhopal Gas Tragedy which was considered as the worst industrial tragedy in India.

Sections for environment protection act

This act has four Chapters and 26 Sections. 
 
Chapter one consists of Preliminary information such as Short Title, Extend, Date of Commencement and Definitions. The definitions are given in the second section of the Act. Chapter two describes general powers of Central Government. Chapter 3 gives the Central Government the power to take action to protect the environment. Chapter 4 allows government to appoint officers to achieve these objectives. It also gives the government the power to give direction to closure, prohibition or regulation of industry, pollution. The act has provisions for penalties for contravention of the provisions of the act and rules, orders and directions. It also gives detail if the offence is done by a company or government department. It says for such offence the in-charge and head of department respectively would be liable for punishment.

Restricted areas
The areas on which restriction has been imposed by this act include Doon Valley in Uttarakhand, Aravali Regions in Alwar, Rajasthan, Coastal zones and ecologically sensitive zones, etc.

See also

 Air (Prevention and Control of Pollution) Act,1981
 Forest Conservation Act, 1980
 Wildlife Protection Act, 1972
 Water Act, 1974

References

External links 
 Text of the Act

Environmental law in India
Acts of the Parliament of India 1986
1986 in the environment